Sir Richard Frederick Crawford, GCMG, KBE (18 June 1863 – 6 August 1919) was a British public servant.

Interview with NYTimes

Crawford was a Commissioner of Customs from 1904 to 1911. He was later Commercial Adviser to His Majesty's Embassy at Washington, achieving the rank of Minister Plenipotentiary in the Diplomatic Service. He was appointed KCMG in 1911, KBE in 1917, and GCMG in 1919. He was also an adviser to the Turkish Minister of Finance.

References 

 https://www.ukwhoswho.com/view/10.1093/ww/9780199540891.001.0001/ww-9780199540884-e-195150

1863 births
1919 deaths
Members of HM Diplomatic Service
Knights Grand Cross of the Order of St Michael and St George
Knights Commander of the Order of the British Empire
20th-century British diplomats